Ke Huibing (5 February 1979 – 19 February 2020) was a Chinese management scientist, professor and doctoral advisor at the Huazhong University of Science and Technology.

Career
Ke was educated at Law School of Hubei University, majoring in law, where he graduated in June 2002 and obtained a bachelor's degree. In June 2005, he graduated from the School of Sociology of Huazhong University of Science and Technology with a doctor's degree in management. In June 2008, he obtained a doctor's degree in management in Wuhan University Social Security Research Center. Since July 2008, he was a teacher of management science at the School of Social Sciences of Huazhong University of Science and Technology. His professional direction was social security theory and policy, social welfare and social work.

Ke was a member of China social security 30 forum young scholars Alliance. He was also the chairman of the labor union of School of Social Sciences.

Health and death
He planned to have surgery right after the Chinese Lunar New Year (24 January 2020), however, an unexpected coronavirus outbreak disrupted his treatment. On 10 February 2020, he was hospitalized. His colleagues raised money for him on an internet platform.

Ke died in Wuhan on 19 February 2020, aged 41. He was the fifth professor of the Huazhong University of Science and Technology who died during the coronavirus pandemic, other four professors being, Hong Ling, Lin Zhengbin, and Duan Zhengcheng.

Works

References

1979 births
2020 deaths
People from Huangmei County
Management scientists
Hubei University alumni
Huazhong University of Science and Technology alumni
Wuhan University alumni
Academic staff of Huazhong University of Science and Technology
Deaths from lymphoma
Deaths from the COVID-19 pandemic in China
Deaths from cancer in the People's Republic of China